The Czechoslovak First League was the premier football league in the Czechoslovakia from 1925 to 1993, with the exception of World War II. Czechoslovakia was occupied by German forces who formed Gauliga Sudetenland and Gauliga Böhmen und Mähren leagues on occupied territories. Until the 1934-35 season, no teams from Slovakia participated in the league.

Czechs were allowed to run their own league in the Protectorate of Bohemia and Moravia, while Slovaks were granted their own independent Slovak State and created their own league. After the World War II the league was recreated.

Description
The league was dominated by clubs from Prague with Sparta Prague winning 19 titles, Dukla Prague 11 and Slavia Prague 9.

The attendance record for the league was set on 4 September 1965, when 50,105 spectators attended a match between rivals Sparta and Slavia in Prague.

The Czechoslovak First League was succeeded in 1993 by the Czech First League in the Czech Republic and the Slovak Superliga in Slovakia.

Names
 1925 First Association League (teams from Prague only)
 1925–29 Central Bohemian First League (teams from Prague and Central Bohemia)
 1929–34 First Association League (expanded to include Moravian teams)
 1934–38 State League (expanded to include Slovak teams)
 1938–44 Bohemian-Moravian League (World War II, Czechoslovakia split)
 1945–48 State League (Czechoslovak Republic reinstated)
 1949–50 First All-National Championship
 1951–55 Republic Championship
 1956–93 First League

Champions

1925–1938

Bohemia-Moravia 1938–1944

1945–1993

Performance by club

Player records 
Josef Bican was the all-time top goalscorer of the league with 447 goals in 279 matches, of which 417 goals were scored for Slavia Praha and 30 goals for FC Vítkovice. The list below is not the leagues top goalscorers all in all, only players who at some point played for Slavia Praha.

Top goalscorers (players who played for Slavia Praha only)

See also 
 Czechoslovak Cup
 Czech First League
 Slovak Superliga

References

External links 
 Full tables on RSSSF

 
Czechoslovakia
1925 establishments in Czechoslovakia
1